Asociación Deportiva Ceuta B was a Spanish football team based in the autonomous city of Ceuta. Founded in 1996, it was the reserve team of AD Ceuta, and held home matches at Estadio Alfonso Murube, with a capacity of 6,500.

History
In 1997, Ceuta B was created as the reserve team of newly-formed Asociación Deportiva Ceuta, and achieved promotion to Tercera División in 1999. After suffering immediate relegation, the club played a further season in Regional Preferente before ceasing activities for one year.

Ceuta B returned to an active status in 2002, winning two Preferente titles (in the 2004–05 and 2006–07 seasons) but not achieving promotion on both occasions. In 2005, the club won the first leg against Melilla-based side CD Basto by 5–3, and despite being 2–0 ahead in the second leg, they were eliminated after a court decision which gave Basto a 3–0 win, knocking Ceuta B out of the competition. In 2007, the club defeated CD Peña Ciudad de Melilla 3–2 on aggregate, but gave up on playing in the fourth tier in July of that year, due to the lack of budget.

Season to season

1 season in Tercera División

Notable players
 Munir Mohamedi

References

B
Defunct football clubs in Spain
Football clubs in Ceuta
Association football clubs established in 1997
Association football clubs disestablished in 2012
1997 establishments in Spain
2012 disestablishments in Spain